Korean gardens are a type of garden described as being natural, informal, simple and unforced, seeking to merge with the natural world. They have a history that goes back more than two thousand years, but are little known in the west. The oldest records date to the Three Kingdoms period (57 BC – 668 AD) when architecture and palace gardens showed a development noted in the Korean History of the Three Kingdoms.

History

Korean garden culture can be traced back more than 2,000 years. In recent years, 300 documents have been found, written during the Koryo (918–1392) and Choson (1392–1910) dynasties, that contain detailed records about traditional Korean gardens, many of which survive and can be visited today.

In prehistoric times, Koreans worshipped nature, the sun, stars, water, rocks, stones, and trees. They especially believed that rocks had more power than water and other things in nature. Also, they have believed that rocks engendered God's good-will. Therefore, the arrangement of rocks is considered one of the "essential" elements in designing the traditional Korean garden. Koreans have recently rediscovered their stone garden tradition in the stacked stone altars that express the ancient concept of a round heaven and square earth. Also Susok or "rock arrangement," gardens are commonly found. In recent years, in fact, there has been a revival of interest in rock arrangements in gardens. In general, Korean Susok (rock arrangement) garden culture can be described according to its stages of development. Even during the primitive agricultural period, stones were an essential element in building gardens. Then, rock arrangements for shamanic rituals were built in the shape of shrines or heavenly altars.

During the Three Kingdoms period (57 BC – 668 AD), palace gardens were erected on a grand scale with stones. And in the 4th-century temple gardens were introduced along with Buddhism. Since the early Koryo dynasty, when Buddhism was established as the national religion, gardens evolved into the style of Hwagye (terraced rock garden), which represented Son (Zen) Buddhist rock arrangements. In the middle of the Koryo period, a new style of stone garden, called Imchon, which contained a pavilion and a stone pond in beautiful forest surroundings, became popular. During the Joseon dynasty, the Hwagye garden style was popular in the yards of many homes, and mansion gardens were usually built in Imchon style.

Style and symbolism

Korean gardens are structured to live in harmony with pre-existing landscapes. Sites are chosen in favor of the energy flow called pungsu 풍수, geomancy which affects all aspects of life including health, wealth, and happiness. Unlike gardening styles of the west, the construction of a Korean garden must be done with as little disruption to the pre-existing site as possible, and can even lend from the surrounding view, such as mountains on the horizon, into its own appearance. The gardens can be found enclosed within walls of stone or brick or can blend seamlessly into its surroundings without a barrier.

Buildings and pavilions in the gardens are minimal in number and unobtrusive to the thriving natural landscape. Stylized flowers and blossoms that hold great symbolism, such as the Sacred Lotus and plum blossoms, are painted onto Buddhist temples, royal tombs, and palace pavilions in bright yet harmonious colors; a style called dancheong 단청, or “red and blue/green.”

Traditional spiritual and philosophical symbolism can be found throughout Korean gardens; Shamanistic, Animist, Buddhist, Daoist, and Confucian influences along with homage to the Dangun Creation story are often simultaneously represented. From the clear symbols such as stylized decorations painted on pavilions and buildings, to the use of colors and the number and types of trees, rocks, ponds, and plants, all Korean gardens hold a significance of beauty aesthetically, culturally, and spiritually.

Examples of Tree Types and their Meanings:

    Persimmon: The Persimmon tree symbolizes transformation. Jill Mathews, author of Korean Gardens, writes, “… their fruit starts off hard, green, and extremely bitter but ripens to a bright orange and becomes very soft and sweet…”

   Korean Red Pine: Symbolizes loyalty, constancy, and righteousness. The bark resembles the shell of the tortoise, which symbolizes longevity. Often used near Confucian scholarly buildings and pavilions. Called sonamu 소나무 meaning supreme tree.

   Bamboo: Simplicity, integrity, flexibility. Its uprightness symbolizes strength while its hollow stem equates to open-mindedness.

  Crepe Myrtle: Baerong Namu 배롱나무, meaning “Tree with flowers lasting more than 100 days”, symbolize integrity and loyalty of Confucian scholars and can be found in Confucian academy gardens.

Flowers:

  Peonies: Known as the Queen of Flowers, both the tree peony and the herbaceous peony symbolize royalty, riches, honor, female beauty, and love.

  Lotus: The lotus is recognizable as a sacred symbol in Buddhism and can be found in ponds of both Buddhist temples and Confucian academies, symbolizing purity, transformation, and enlightenment.

  Rocks: The symbolism of rocks can be found in their number and structure, for instance, three rocks in an arrangement can represent the three mountain gods in the Dangun creation story. Matthews notes that, “… rocks appear in two’s, three’s, nine’s, or twelves, although there are occasional extravagant arrangements of sixty.” Rocks can be selected and assigned special names either based upon their appearance, or some unconnected meaning, however, no stones are taken from far distances and added to the garden.

Ponds: Ponds symbolize tranquility and stillness; inviting deep contemplation from visitors. Their bridges can symbolize moving from lower thought processes to more sacred thoughts, or the movement from life on Earth into the tranquil afterlife. The Daoist and Confucian belief that heaven is round and the Earth is square is often reflected in the appearance of ponds and their island; the pond being square in shape and the island being round. "Few Korean gardens are considered complete without at least one pond."

Representative Korean gardens

The most central and representative and relatively undisturbed classical Korean gardens are in three complexes.

The Iseong mountain fortress of Baekje near Seoul, where one finds numerous rockeries depicting turtles, dragons or phoenixes
The Anak Palace Garden of Goguryeo near Pyongyang, where one finds the remains of three rock Garden complexes.
The Anapji Garden of Silla in Gyeongju is perhaps the best known, with three islands in the pond, man-made waterfalls in two tiers, granite basins of round and square design as well as hundreds of rock arrangement along its curbed shore.

Further important gardens, often historical recreations, are found at these sites:

 The rear garden of Changdeok Palace in Seoul, especially the Buyong pond with the pavilion of cosmic union.
 The Chongpyeong-sa temple near Chuncheon.

Restoration work

National scholars in the Republic of Korea are now attempting to build a database through drawings, photographs, and surveys of the landscape of traditional gardens, and attempt recreations.

Rumoured attempts at recreating classical Korean gardens are said to be occurring on small scales in the Democratic People's Republic of Korea, but as yet there is no pictorial evidence.

Trees, plants and symbolic landscape of a Korean garden

The vernacular of the Korean garden generally includes evergreen trees (various species of Korean pine) as a constant; flowering pear trees in the spring; bamboo forests alongside the secondary entrance gates of temples and palaces symbolizing fidelity and honesty; and straight walks tend to be bordered by larger sized gravels of irregular shape. These features are especially noticeable in restorations.

Terrain tends to follow natural courses, and unlike the traditional Chinese garden, the use of straight paths is not proscribed, but lessened. Significant or important elements tend to face east. And Korean readings of Pungsu are regarded with great care, as geomancy was a strong influence in aligning the gardens with stelae, halls, and buildings.

Unusual features

A Korean garden is interesting for attracting various birds. Animals were important to the natural appeal of the garden, so stone animals and animal motifs were common as well as actual fish, birds, and other creatures.

A Korean garden will often have a decorative pavilion from which the surrounding garden can be enjoyed. Scholars from the yangban aristocracy sat in their pavilions constructed in either a cultivated garden or a natural area with its own view of the mountains or landscape. These served as places of relaxation and enjoyment and as a place to receive other men to be entertained or to talk about business. Playing chess, painting, resting and other leisurely activities were also pursued in these pavilions because of the exceptional view and surrounding beauty.

A Korean garden may also often have ponds because water is an important element to any garden for practical reasons such as plant watering and cooling the temperature. It was also important in old days because it prevented the wooden buildings of Korea from burning down. In the garden, a murky green color is prized unlike the Western love of blue water. Clear water is generally found in streams and natural water sources rather than ponds which are dug out on purpose in a convenient spot. Sometimes the water looks black if the inside of the pond is walled with stone blocks. Lotuses are usually the most common thing to plant in a pond, but there are many unusual options other than lotuses.

Huwon in Changduk Palace is a huge garden showing the refined style of the imperial family. It contains many trees which are hundreds of years old however and is carefully monitored and preserved from the public. The style of Huwon is very different from the gardens of the yangban classes and is much more refined. However, like all Korean gardens, it has a very natural beauty in which the royal family could rest in a private place.

Korean gardens abroad

A traditional Korean garden is currently under construction in Nantes, France. "Suncheon Garden", a 5000 square metre site, is enclosed within Blottereau Park, and celebrates the 120th anniversary of diplomatic ties between South Korea and France. There are traditional Korean gardens in the Chapultepec Zoo in Mexico City; Gençlik Park in Ankara, Turkey; in Cairo, Egypt; le Jardin d'Acclimatation de Paris; Erholungspark Marzahn in Berlin; Grüneburgpark in Frankfurt; and at the VanDusen Botanical Garden in Vancouver, Canada. The Korean Ambassador's Residence Garden in Washington, D.C. is a typical example of a well-maintained Korean garden.

Korean Garden Society

The Traditional Korean Garden Society in Seoul, ROK, often sponsors lectures and tours of Korean gardens with Professor Sim Woo-kyung often acting as host and landscape interpreter.

See also
Culture of Korea
East Asian gardens
History of Korea

References

External links

Examples and simple outline of Korean gardens
The Herbert Offen Research Collection of the Phillips Library at the Peabody Essex Museum
 Matthews, J 'Traditional Korean Gardens' Landscape Outlook pp 12-16, Winter, 2010 (on SSRN)
 Kim, Dong-uk Palaces of Korea Hollym, Seoul, 2006
 Kyun, Heo (trans. Baker, DL) Gardens of Korea: Harmony with Intellect and Nature Saffron Book, London, 2005
 Min, Kyung-Hyun Korean Gardens Borim Editions, Seoul, 1992

Garden
Types of garden by country of origin